A frisbee is a type of gliding toy.

Frisbee may also refer to:

Frisbee (album), an album by Caramelos de Cianuro
Frisbee (ride), an amusement ride
Frisbee (sculpture), an artwork by Patrick Villiers Farrow
Frisbee (TV channel), an Italian TV channel
Frisbee, Missouri, a community in the United States
Sasha Belle, American drag queen now known as Frisbee Jenkins

See also 
 
 Frisby (disambiguation)
 Frisbie (disambiguation)